Gholam Mohammad Sarani (also Romanized as Gholām Moḩammad Sārānī) is a village in Dust Mohammad Rural District, in the Central District of Hirmand County, Sistan and Baluchestan Province, Iran. At the 2006 census, its population was 116, in 24 families.

References 

Populated places in Hirmand County